Christopher Atkins Bomann (born February 21, 1961) is an American actor and businessman, perhaps best known for his debut in the 1980 film The Blue Lagoon and playing Peter Richards in Dallas (1983–1984).

Early life
Christopher Atkins Bomann was born and raised in Rye, New York. He is the son of Donald Bomann and Bitsy Nebauer, who divorced during his childhood. Atkins was an aspiring baseball player; when his baseball aspirations were derailed by knee problems, he started a modeling career. When he began acting, Atkins dropped the last name Bomann and used his middle name, Atkins, as his last name.

Career

A friend suggested that Atkins audition for The Blue Lagoon. The film's director, Randal Kleiser, stated that Atkins was a sailing instructor with no acting experience when he was cast in the film. Atkins and co-star Brooke Shields played teenaged cousins who find love while living in an isolated tropical paradise after being marooned as children. Released in 1980, the film grossed over $58 million with a production cost of $4.5 million but received negative critical responses. Atkins appeared both nude and scantily clad in the film. While Blue Lagoon was controversial due to its nude scenes and sexual content, it nevertheless became a "pop culture phenomenon". Although Atkins was nominated for a Golden Globe Award for New Star of the Year in a Motion Picture – Male for The Blue Lagoon, critical responses to his performance were negative. A TV Guide reviewer wrote that "Atkins looks as if he would be more at home on a surfboard," and Gary Arnold wrote in The Washington Post that Atkins' performance "evoke[s] modeling sessions and beach-party movies." 

In 1982 Atkins posed nude for Playgirl, and co-starred with Kristy McNichol in The Pirate Movie (1982), an update of Gilbert and Sullivan's operetta The Pirates of Penzance. His song "How Can I Live Without Her", which peaked at #71 on the Billboard Hot 100, was used in that film. For his performance in the film A Night in Heaven (1983), Atkins won the 1983 Golden Raspberry Award for Worst Actor. For one season (1983–1984), Atkins had a recurring role as camp counselor Peter Richards on Dallas.

In 1999, Atkins appeared in the television sitcom Suddenly Susan, which starred Shields. In 2009, Atkins appeared on VH1's Confessions of a Teen Idol, a reality show featuring former teen idols. Atkins was ranked no. 76 on VH1's list of 100 Greatest Teen Stars.

Atkins became a luxury pool builder and co-developed the Christopher Atkins Strike Jacket E.F.L. (Extreme Fishing Lure), "a rubbery slipcovering for traditional baits."

Personal life

Atkins married Lyn Barron Weber of Sydney, Australia, on May 25, 1985. They have two children: son Grant Bomann (b. 1985) and daughter Brittney Bomann (b. 1987). They divorced in 2007.

In a 2009 interview, Atkins acknowledged his past struggle with alcoholism and stated that he had been sober for 22 years.

Filmography

Film and television

References

External links

 
 
 

1961 births
Living people
20th-century American male actors
21st-century American male actors
Male actors from New York (state)
American people of German descent
American male film actors
American male television actors
American male voice actors
American male singers
American male pop singers
American businesspeople
People from Rye, New York
Playgirl Men of the Month